The Leelanau Peninsula AVA is an American Viticultural Area located in Leelanau County, Michigan.
This Michigan wine region includes all of Leelanau County, which forms a peninsula between Lake Michigan on the west and Grand Traverse Bay on the east.   Being surrounded by water helps to moderate the climate of the region, which is generally cold for viticulture.  Frost can occur on all but about 145 days of the calendar year.  The soil in Leelanau Peninsula is complex, with glacial deposits of clay, sand, and loam on top of bedrock of granite and limestone. The hardiness zones are 6a and 6b.

References

External links
 From the Vine: Leelanau Peninsula Wine Trail Article about the Leelanau AVA.
 Leelanau Peninsula Vintners Association Leelanau AVA wine trail web site with information about the wineries.

American Viticultural Areas
Geography of Leelanau County, Michigan
Michigan wine
1982 establishments in Michigan